The Dawning is a 1988 British drama film based on Jennifer Johnston's novel, The Old Jest, which depicts the Irish War of Independence through the eyes of the Anglo-Irish landlord class. It stars Anthony Hopkins, Hugh Grant, Jean Simmons, Trevor Howard, and Rebecca Pidgeon, and was produced by Sarah Lawson, through her company Lawson Productions.

Plot
The film opens with Angus Barrie (Anthony Hopkins), an Irish Republican Army member, walking through hills, and coming to rest on a beach, where there is a little hut. Meanwhile, Nancy Gulliver (Rebecca Pidgeon) having just left school, burns all her books in happiness. It is her birthday, and her aunt (Jean Simmons) has invited over Harry (Hugh Grant), with whom she’s desperately in love, to tea. However, during the course of the film, as a result of Harry’s behaviour with another girl and the way he treats Nancy, she realises that her love for Harry was nothing more than childish infatuation.

One day, Nancy goes down to the beach, and notices that her hut has been slept in. She leaves a note requesting that it be left alone. Soon after, she is on the beach reading, when Barrie comes up to her. Over the course of the film, the two develop a relationship, despite her not really knowing and understanding his job: he is one of the first people that became part of a group named the IRA, and is on the run from the government. Nevertheless, she grows fond of Barrie, and dubs him "Cassius" ("because you have a lean and hungry look!")

After Cassius asks her to pass on a message to a colleague, several Officers of the British Army are gunned down at a horse race show. Later that day, Captain Rankin (played by Adrian Dunbar) of the Black and Tans comes to see the  Family, and asks  if anyone  knows where Cassius is. The officers' suspicion is aroused when Nancy's grandfather (played by Trevor Howard) says he saw her talking to a man on the beach. She denies any knowledge. When they leave, she runs to the hut  on the beach where Cassius was staying to tell him to flee, only to find that he has already packed. As they walk out, a light shines on them: the Black and Tans have 
found him. He is gunned down, much to Nancy's distress. The film ends with Nancy back at home, considerably older and wiser than when the film started.

Cast
Anthony Hopkins as Cassius a.k.a. Angus Barrie
Rebecca Pidgeon as Nancy Gulliver
Jean Simmons as Aunt Mary
Trevor Howard as Grandfather
Tara MacGowran as Maeve
Hugh Grant as Harry
Nicholas Fitzsimons as Slain Soldier
Ronnie Masterson as Bridie
John Rogan as Mr. Carroll
Joan O'Hara as Maurya
Charmian May as Celia Brabazon
Ann Way as George Brabazon
Mark O'Regan as Joe Mulhare
Brendan Laird as Tommy Roche
Adrian Dunbar as Capt. Rankin
Geoffrey Greenhill as Cpl. Tweedie

Production
The Dawning was filmed in Ireland in the mid-1980s, largely on location in Ireland.The beach scenes were filmed extensively at Goat Island, a small cove on the Irish coast, close to the county boundary between Cork and Waterford. Some "Big House" exteriors were shot at Woodbine Hill in the same district. Incidentally, it was Rebecca Pidgeon's first feature film, and Trevor Howard's final film; he died shortly after production ended, and the film was dedicated to him. (Howard had made an earlier IRA film in 1946, the classic I See a Dark Stranger.) It was also Jean Simmons' first feature film for nearly ten years. Despite having contributed largely to the production, Bernard MacLaverty was uncredited as a screenwriter. The film was shown at the AFI/Los Angeles International Film Festival (New British Cinema - BritFest 2), the Cannes Film Festival (for market purposes), and at the Montreal World Film Festival (in competition, where it was successful, winning two prizes). Actors Anthony Hopkins and Hugh Grant reunited five years later in the Academy Award-nominated film The Remains of the Day.

Critical reception 
The Dawning was received largely positively by the critics, with a five star review from Time Out, describing the film as "solidly crafted ... its main strength lies in the performances" and mentioning that Rebecca Pidgeon had given a "remarkable debut". China Daily noted that Hopkins had played his character "wonderfully".

Awards and nominations
Montreal World Film Festival (1988)
won Jury Prize Robert Knights
won Prize of the Ecumenical Jury - Special Mention - Robert Knights
Austin Texas International Film Festival (1988)
Won best picture award

References

External links
 
 

Irish republicanism
Irish War of Independence films
Films about the Irish Republican Army
1980s historical drama films
Films based on Irish novels
British historical drama films
English-language Irish films
1980s English-language films
Films directed by Robert Knights